Bitting Historic District is in Wichita, Kansas. The working class area was built out during several architectural periods. It has a shopping area of two-story buildings. The District is located along a section of Bitting Avenue. There is also a Bitting Building downtown. It was added to the National Register of Historic Places in 2004.

See also
 National Register of Historic Places listings in Sedgwick County, Kansas

References

Victorian architecture in Kansas
Buildings and structures in Wichita, Kansas
Historic districts on the National Register of Historic Places in Kansas
National Register of Historic Places in Sedgwick County, Kansas